The American Athletic Conference Men's Basketball Coach of the Year is a basketball award given to the American Athletic Conference's most outstanding head coach. The conference formed in 2013–14 after many schools departed from the original Big East Conference to form their own conference. Mick Cronin of Cincinnati was the first-ever winner.

Key

Winners

Winners by school
In this table, the "year joined" reflects the calendar year when each school joined the conference. The "Years" column reflects the calendar year in which each award was presented.

References

NCAA Division I men's basketball conference coaches of the year
Coach Of The Year
Awards established in 2014